Hamanu was a city of Elam, which was razed by Ashurbanipal during his Assyrian conquest of Elam conquest of Elam in 645-635 BCE. Ashurbanipal wrote in his inscriptions:

References

Elam